The fifth season of the television series Buffy the Vampire Slayer premiered on September 26, 2000 on The WB and concluded its 22-episode season on May 22, 2001. It maintained its previous timeslot, airing Tuesdays at 8:00 pm ET. This was the final season to air on The WB before it moved to UPN; The WB billed the season five finale as "The WB series finale".

Plot 
In the season premiere, the famous vampire Count Dracula makes an appearance in Sunnydale in search of Buffy. He then bites Buffy in the same place where she was bitten by The Master and Angel ("Prophecy Girl" and "Graduation Day"). Buffy breaks free from his will and Dracula is defeated and staked, but not killed because of Dracula's extraordinary powers.

Season five introduces Buffy's younger "sister", Dawn, who suddenly appears in Buffy's life. Although she is new to the series, to the characters it is as if she has always been there; but Buffy remains somewhat suspicious and jealous of Dawn's bond with their mother. Xander's girlfriend Anya Jenkins begins to experience deeper human emotions, both negative and positive, such as a love for money. Anya is hired by Giles and works alongside him at a magic shop called The Magic Box.

Meanwhile, Glorificus, or Glory, a hell-goddess who was exiled from her dimension after a war, has come to Earth. She can only remain there by being connected to her human form; a medical intern called Ben. Glory takes the form of a beautiful young woman, with some of her powers still intact as long as she maintains her strength through draining people of their sanity. She begins searching for a "Key" that will allow her to return to her Hell dimension by blurring the lines between dimensions, and in the process unleashing Hell on Earth. At the beginning of the season Glory and Ben are vying for control, alternating who possesses the body they share; later the line between them begins to blur and they experience each other's emotions and memories.

When Joyce suffers from unexplained headaches, Buffy suspects Dawn may be harming her, but they discover that they were caused by a brain tumor. Buffy soon discovers that the Key's protectors had turned the Key into a human biologically related to the Summers — her new sister Dawn. At the same time, they implanted in her family and friends lifelong memories of her. As a result, Buffy, and especially Joyce, begin to accept Dawn as a true part of the family. Upon learning of Joyce's tumor, Buffy leaves her dorm to take care of her mother. Spike, still implanted with the Initiative chip, realizes he is in love with Buffy and begins fighting alongside the Scoobies after learning of Joyce's tumor and supports Dawn when she learns of her true origins. Riley leaves Buffy in the middle of the season after concluding that she does not love him, joining a military demon-hunting operation. The Watchers' Council, with which Buffy had previously cut ties, aids in Buffy's research of Glory, and the Council reinstates both her and Giles. When she learns of Spike's feelings for her while he tortures her, Buffy continually refuses his advances and alienates him from the group.

Near the end of the season, Joyce dies of an aneurysm, devastating Dawn and Buffy; Buffy drops out of college to take care of Dawn, who starts skipping school in her grief. Spike commissions Warren Mears to build a robot version of Buffy, later known as the Buffybot. This greatly angers Buffy, but she soon softens after Spike is tortured by Glory yet refuses to reveal that Dawn is the Key. After this ordeal, Buffy warms up to Spike, promising she will not forget what he has done for her and inviting him back into her life. Glory attacks Willow's girlfriend Tara Maclay, draining her of her sanity. In a rage, Willow turns to dark magic in order to gain powers to match Glory's. She vengefully attacks the hell goddess futilely and is nearly killed, but Buffy intervenes. Despite the defeat, this event results in Willow becoming significantly more powerful, but her dependency on magic increases and her personality starts to change in a sinister way.

Glory discovers that Dawn is the Key and kidnaps her. In a moment alone, Xander proposes to Anya. Buffy and her friends track Glory and Dawn to a tower built by Glory's minions. At the time of the ritual, Glory uses Dawn's blood to open the portal between dimensions, but she is distracted by the Scoobies' intervention. Willow takes Tara's sanity from Glory and gives it back, severely weakening Glory. After overpowering Glory, Buffy tells her to leave Sunnydale or die. When Glory reverts to Ben, Giles kills Ben to prevent her return. Dawn wants to sacrifice herself to save the world, but Buffy realizes that because she is related to Dawn, her own blood can also close the portal. She realizes the meaning of the First Slayer's message — "Death is your gift" — and sacrifices her own life to save Dawn's and close the portal. Buffy's friends mourn her death and praise her with the inscription on her headstone, "She saved the world a lot."

Cast and characters

Main cast 
 Sarah Michelle Gellar as Buffy Summers
 Nicholas Brendon as Xander Harris
 Alyson Hannigan as Willow Rosenberg
 Marc Blucas as Riley Finn
 Emma Caulfield as Anya Jenkins
 Michelle Trachtenberg as Dawn Summers
 James Marsters as Spike
 Anthony Stewart Head as Rupert Giles

Recurring cast

Guest cast 
 Julie Benz as Darla
 Dean Butler as Hank Summers
 Amelinda Embry as Katrina Silber
 Sharon Ferguson as First Slayer
 Kali Rocha as Cecily Addams
 Harris Yulin as Quentin Travers

Crew 
Series creator Joss Whedon served as executive producer and showrunner, and wrote and directed three episodes including the season finale. Marti Noxon was promoted to co-executive producer and wrote three episodes, including directing two of them. Jane Espenson was promoted to producer and wrote or co-wrote five episodes. David Fury was promoted to supervising producer and wrote three episodes. Douglas Petrie was promoted to co-producer and wrote or co-wrote four episodes. New additions in the fifth season included Rebecca Rand Kirshner, who wrote three episodes and Steven S. DeKnight, who wrote two episodes.

David Solomon directed the highest number of episodes in the fifth season, directing four episodes and was promoted to producer. Joss Whedon, James A. Contner (also co-producer), and David Grossman each directed three.

Episodes

Crossovers with Angel 
The fifth season of Buffy the Vampire Slayer aired along with the second season of Angel. Both shows retained their timeslots on The WB Television Network, airing on Tuesdays at 8:00 PM ET and 9:00 PM ET respectively.

The Buffy episode "Fool for Love" is a companion to the Angel episode "Darla". Both episodes feature multiple flashbacks to the history of Spike (James Marsters) and Darla (Julie Benz), shown from their respective viewpoints. Angel (David Boreanaz) and Drusilla (Juliet Landau) also appear in both episodes. Both episodes feature a same scene – one from the point of view of Spike and the other from Angelus, Darla, and Drusilla.

Buffy recurring character Drusilla makes her first present-tense appearance on Angel in the episode "The Trial". She returns to Sunnydale in her final present-tense appearance in the episode "Crush".

Angel visits Buffy in the episode "Forever" to comfort her after he learns that her mother died.

Buffy recurring character Harmony Kendall (Mercedes McNab) visits L.A. in the Angel episode "Disharmony". Harmony would later appear in the fifth season of Angel and become a main character. Willow (Alyson Hannigan) also appears in the episode in a conversation with Cordelia (Charisma Carpenter) over the phone.

Willow comes to L.A. in the Angel season two finale, "There's No Place Like Plrtz Glrb" to deliver the news to Angel that Buffy had died.

Reception 
The series was included in the American Film Institute's list for the best drama series of the year. Joss Whedon was nominated for a Nebula Award for Best Script for "The Body". The series was nominated for three Television Critics Association Awards, for Individual Achievement in Drama (Sarah Michelle Gellar), Outstanding Achievement in Drama, and Program of the Year.

The episode "The Body" was particularly highly acclaimed by critics. David Bianculli in the New York Daily News commends the acting abilities of Sarah Michelle Gellar, Michelle Trachtenberg, Alyson Hannigan, and Amber Benson. "The Body", according to Bianculli is "Emmy-worthy ... It also will haunt you—but not in the normal way associated with this still-evolving, still-achieving series." Television critic Alesia Redding and editor Joe Vince of the South Bend Tribune write, "I was riveted by this show ... This isn't just one of the best Buffy episodes of all time. It's one of the best episodes of TV of all time." Redding adds, "If you watch this incredible episode and don't recognize it as great TV, you're hopeless ... A 'fantasy' show delivers the most stark and realistic take on death I've ever seen, deftly depicting how a loved one who dies suddenly becomes 'the body'."

Gareth McLean in The Guardian rejected the notion that Buffy is similar to other "schmaltzy American teen show(s)" like Dawson's Creek: "This episode was a brave, honest and wrenching portrayal of death and loss. The way this was handled by Joss Whedon ... was ingenious. Time slowed down and the feeling of numbness was palpable as Buffy and her gang tried to come to terms with Joyce's death." McLean especially appreciated the small details of Buffy protecting Joyce's dignity and the confusion shown by the characters. He concludes, "Joyce may be dead but long live Buffy the Vampire Slayer."

At Salon.com, Joyce Millman wrote, "there hasn't been a finer hour of drama on TV this year than ... 'The Body' ... You have to hand it to the writers; Joyce's demise came as a complete surprise. In that instant, Buffy's childhood officially ends. Even if Buffy gets stiffed in every other Emmy category this year, 'The Body' should convince the nominating committee that Gellar is for real ... I can't remember the last time I saw a more wrenching portrayal of the shock of loss." Andrew Gilstrap at PopMatters declares it "possibly the finest hour of television I've seen, bar none ... It is an incredibly moving episode, one that finally admits that you don't walk away from death unscathed. It also shows that, for all the group's slaying experience, they really weren't prepared for death when it stole a loved one." The Futon Critic named "The Body" the best episode of 2001.

Entertainment Weekly named "The Gift" one of TV's best season finales ever.

The fifth season averaged 4.5 million viewers. Rotten Tomatoes gave season five a score of 82% with an average rating of 7.5 out of 10 based on 11 reviews with a critics consensus stating, "Brilliant, risky and beautiful, Buffy reaches past the missteps of season four to deliver a fresh, unpredictable season that ends with a bang."

DVD release 
Buffy the Vampire Slayer: The Complete Fifth Season was released on DVD in region 1 on December 9, 2003 and in region 2 on October 28, 2002. The DVD includes all 22 episodes on 6 discs presented in full frame 1.33:1 aspect ratio (region 1) and in anamorphic widescreen 1.78:1 aspect ratio (region 2 and 4). Special features on the DVD include four commentary tracks—"Real Me" by writer David Fury and director David Grossman; "Fool for Love" by writer Doug Petrie; "I Was Made to Love You" by writer Jane Espenson; and "The Body" by writer and director Joss Whedon. Scripts for "The Replacement", "Fool for Love", "Into the Woods", and "Checkpoint" are included. Featurettes include, "Buffy Abroad", which details the international popularity of the show; "Demonology: A Slayer's Guide", a featurette presented by Danny Strong showcasing the various demons on the show; "Casting Buffy", which details the casting process of all the main actors; "Action Heroes!: The Stunts of Buffy" details the stunts and features behind-the-scenes footage with the stunt actors; "Natural Causes", a featurette on the episode "The Body"; "Spotlight on Dawn" details the introduction of the character and interview with actress Michelle Trachtenberg; and "The Story of Season 5", a 30-minute featurette where cast and crew members discuss the season. Also included are series outtakes, Buffy video game trailer, photo galleries, and DVD-ROM content.

References

External links 
 
 List of Buffy the Vampire Slayer season 5 episodes at BuffyGuide.com
 

 
2000 American television seasons
2001 American television seasons
Child abduction in television